Catherine Duncan (17 March 1915 – 14 August 2006) was an Australian documentary filmmaker, actor, playwright, film researcher, script writer, film critic, archivist, and collagist. She is most well known for her work in radio broadcasts and short documentary films.

Early life 
Catherine Duncan was born in 1915 in Launceston, Tasmania, to parents Gordon and Claire Duncan. Claire grew up immersed in the arts through her mother, who was an actress and producer herself. Duncan began acting by participating in Allan Wilkie's Shakespearian Company when it visited Launceston.
When Duncan turned 16, she enrolled at the University of Melbourne to pursue an arts degree. While enrolled, she joined the Union Theatre Repertory Company and became their lead actress.

Personal life
Duncan was married three times. Her first husband was Roy Mitchell, who later became a program director for Radio Australia. The two were only married for four years before getting a divorce. Next, Duncan met Kim Keane, a journalist with whom she had two children, Micheal and Margarita. In 1947, they divorced and Duncan decided to leave her children with her parents and move to Europe. On her way there, she met Roger Copillet, the first officer on the ship. They married in 1954 and she spent some years living with him in Paris.

Career
Duncan began her career on stage by joining Melbourne's Worker's Theatre Group after university. Her first success as a playwright was when she won the Sydney Theatre League's Playwriting competition in 1937 for The Sword Sung.

Duncan also had a successful radio career where she performed and wrote shorts on air. For her success in radio, she was recognized with an inaugural Macquarie Award in 1946.

Filmography
By the end of 1945, Duncan grew tired of radio and began to make documentary films with the Australian National Film Board and made documentaries to promote Australia to prospective immigrants. A few of her works were:

Catherine Duncan also worked together with radical film maker Joris Ivens and Marion Michelle on a documentary called Indonesia Calling. Duncan worked as a scriptwriter for the film, while Ivens was the Director and Michelle was the cinematographer.

Recognition
The Catherine Duncan Cup, awarded to the winner of an annual competition for Tasmanian amateur theatre groups, was named in her honour.

Further reading
"Duncan, Catherine (-2006) - People and Organisations." Trove. Accessed 13 November 2018. Duncan, Catherine (-2006) - People and organisations.

References

Australian women screenwriters
Australian women film directors
Australian film directors
Australian dramatists and playwrights
1915 births
2006 deaths
20th-century Australian actresses
People from Launceston, Tasmania
Australian emigrants to France
20th-century Australian screenwriters